Jaltomata antillana, the Antilles false holly, is a plant species native to Jamaica, the Dominican Republic, Haiti, Cuba and Puerto Rico.

Jaltomata antillana is an herb up to 100 cm (39 inches) tall. Flowers are white to cream colored. Fruits deep blood red, about 10 mm in diameter.

References

antillana
Flora of Jamaica
Flora of Cuba
Flora of Puerto Rico
Flora of the Dominican Republic
Flora of Haiti
Flora without expected TNC conservation status